The Mark 37 torpedo is a torpedo with electrical propulsion, developed for the US Navy after World War II. It entered service with the US Navy in the early 1950s, with over 3,300 produced. It was phased out of service key with the US Navy during the 1970s, and the stockpiles were sold to foreign navies.

Development
Its engineering development began in 1946 by Westinghouse. It was largely based on the concept of the passive homing Mark 27, with added active homing system tested on modified Mark 18s, and a new torpedo body. Between 1955–56, thirty torpedoes were produced for development testing, with large-scale production commenced shortly afterwards.

Due to its electric propulsion, the torpedo swam smoothly out of the launch tube, instead of having to be ejected by pressurized air, therefore significantly reducing its acoustic launch signature. To allow for water flow around the torpedo while swimming out, several 1" thick guide studs were attached to the torpedo, which although 19" in diameter was designed to be used only from 21" torpedo tubes.

The guidance of a Mk37 mod 0 torpedo was done by a gyroscope control during the initial part of its trajectory, where the gyro control achieved a straight run, a passive sonar homing system, and at the last  by a Doppler-enabled active sonar homing, with magnetostrictive transducers operating at 60 kHz. The electronics was based on miniature vacuum tubes, later on solid-state semiconductor devices.

Modifications

The mod 1 torpedoes were longer, slower and heavier than mod 0, but offered better target acquisition capabilities and higher ability to intercept agile submarines. They used wire-guidance.

As submarines with higher speeds and operating depths appeared, new torpedoes were developed. Of them, NT37C, D, E, and F are based on the Mk37 design.

In 1967, the mod 0s started being refurbished as mod 3, and mod 1 as mod 2.

The torpedoes used Mark 46 silver-zinc batteries. These had a known tendency to overheat, occasionally igniting or exploding. Training torpedoes used reusable rechargeable secondary batteries.

For a long time, the Mark 37 was a primary U.S. submarine-launched ASW torpedo. It was replaced by the Mark 48 starting in 1972. The remaining inventory was then rebuilt and sold to several countries, including Israel, as the NT-37C after the vacuum tube guidance systems were replaced by solid-state electronics and the electric propulsion was replaced with a liquid monopropellant.

Other uses
The Mk 67 submarine launched mobile mine is based on a Mark 37 torpedo body. It entered service in 1983 and is capable of swimming as far as 10 miles through or into a channel, harbor, shallow water area and other zones which would normally be inaccessible to the vessel laying it. After reaching the target area it sinks to the sea bed and acts like a conventionally laid influence mine. The exploder in the Mk 67 warhead is computerised and incorporates magnetic, acoustic and pressure sensors.

General characteristics
 Power plant: Mark 46 silver-zinc battery, two-speed electric motor
 Length:  (mod.0),  (mod.1)
 Weight:  (mod.0),  (mod.1)
 Diameter: 
 Range:  at 17 knots,  at 26 knots
 Depth: 
 Speed: , 
 Warhead:  HBX-3 high explosive with contact exploder
 Date deployed: 1957

References

External links
 Mk3-7 torpedo load, USS Torsk SS-423
 SOVIET SEIZURE OF US PRACTICE TORPEDO
 Tom Pelick: A historical perspective: U.S. Navy's First Active Acoustic Homing Torpedoes

Cold War weapons of the United States
Torpedoes of the United States
Military equipment introduced in the 1950s